Hipoepa is a genus of moths of the family Noctuidae first described by Francis Walker in 1859. It is sometimes considered to be a synonym of Polypogon.

Species
Hipoepa biasalis (Walker, [1859]) Oriental Tropics - Taiwan, Sumatra, Borneo, Philippines, Sulawesi, Seram
Hipoepa fractalis (Guenée, 1854) Africa, Japan, Korea, China, India, Oriental Tropics - Sumatra, Borneo, Sulawesi, Australia
Hipoepa plebejus (Rothschild, 1920) Sumatra, Borneo
Hipoepa porphyrialis (Pagenstecher, 1900) Moluccas, New Guinea

References

Herminiinae